The Bolyu language (also known as Paliu, Palyu, or Lai 俫语, 徕语) is an Austroasiatic language of the Pakanic branch. The Bolyu are among the unrecognized ethnic groups of China.

Classification
Bolyu is related to the Bugan language, forming the Pakanic branch along with it. In 1984, Bolyu was first studied by Liang Min of the Nationalities Research Institute in Beijing. Liang was the first to suggest a Mon–Khmer affiliation of Bolyu, which was later confirmed by Western linguists such as Paul K. Benedict, Paul Sidwell, and Jerold A. Edmondson. However, the place of the Pakanic branch within the Mon–Khmer family is uncertain. Sidwell (1995) suggests that the Pakanic branch may be an Eastern Mon–Khmer branch, thus making it most closely related to the Vietic branch. However, Gérard Diffloth classifies Pakanic as Northern Mon–Khmer, making it most closely related to the Palaungic branch.

Distribution
Bolyu speakers are found in the following locations in southern China.

Douhong 斗烘屯, Xinhe 新合村, Changfa township 长发, Longlin County, Guangxi (often living with Gelao neighbors). Also spoken in the nearby townships of Kechang 克长, De'e 德峨, and Changme 长么.
Xinhe 新合村 - Datiezhai 打铁寨, Changfajie 长发街: 50 speakers
Xinhua 新华村 - Luowan 罗湾: 300; Kabao 卡保, Renshang 仁上: 160 speakers
Villages with only Bolyu people: Muzi 亩子, Dazhai 大寨, Xiaozhai 小寨
Guosha/Hengsha 过沙/亨沙, Wenya 文雅村, Puhe Miao Autonomous Township 普合苗族自治乡, Xilin County, Guangxi. Also spoken in Naya 那牙, Badahe Township 八大河乡. 230 speakers total.

Li (1999) documents the Bolyu variety of Muzitun 亩子屯, Xinhe Village 新合村, Changfa Township 长发乡, Longlin County, Guangxi.

In the following villages, only elderly speakers of Bolyu remain.
Zhelang township 者浪乡: Zhezhai 者寨, Langrong 郎荣, Linghao 岭好
Kechang township 克场乡: Haichang 海长
Shechang township 蛇场乡: Daguo 达果

1,400 Bolyu reside in Guangxi, and over 1,000 in Yunnan.

Phonology
Bolyu is a monosyllabic tonal language like the surrounding Tai–Kadai, Hmong-Mien and even Vietic languages. Unlike Bugan, Bolyu does not have a tense–lax voice quality distinction.

Initial consonants
{| class=wikitable style=text-align:center
|-
! colspan="2" rowspan="2" |
! colspan="3" | Labial
! colspan="3" | Alveolar
! rowspan="2" | Alveolo-palatal
! colspan="3" | Velar
! rowspan="2" | Uvular
! colspan="2" |Glottal
|-
!plain || pal. || vel.
!plain 
!pal.
!sib.
!plain || pal. || lab.
!plain || pal.
|-
! colspan="2" |Nasal
|
|
|
|
|
|
|
|
|
|
|
|
|
|-
! rowspan="3" | Plosive/
Affricate
! voiceless
|
|
|
|
|
|
|
|
|
|
|
|
|
|-
! aspirated
|
|
|
|
|
|
|
|
|
|
|
|
|
|-
! prenasalized
|
|
|
|
|
|
|
|
|
|
|
|
|
|-
! colspan="2" |Fricative
|
|
|
|
|
|
|
|
|
|
|
|
|
|-
! colspan="2" |Approximant
|
|
|
|
|
|
|
|
|
|
|
|
|
|} Bolyu allows for a large variety of consonant clusters, and has eight possible consonantal finals: -p, -t, -k, -m, -n, -ŋ, -w, -j.

Vowels 

There are seven vowels in Bolyu: .

Tones
Bolyu has a total of six tones.

References

 
 
 
 
 
  http://www.docin.com/p-380721709.html
 俫语使用人口稳定增长原因探究. In 中国少数民族语言使用现状及其演变研究.

External links
Bolyu vocabulary from SEAlang

Mangic languages
Pakanic languages
Endangered Austroasiatic languages
Languages of China